The 2012 FIBA U16 European Championship Division C was held in Gibraltar from 24 to 29 July 2012. Seven teams participated in the competition.

Participating teams
 
 (hosts)

Group phase

Group A

Group B

Knockout stage

Bracket

5th – 7th place classification

Final standings

2011–12 in European basketball
FIBA Europe Under-16 Championship
July 2012 sports events in Europe
FIBA U16 European Championship Division C